To the Wind is an American hardcore punk band from Seattle, Washington. Since the band's formation in 2008, they have released 2 EPs and 3 full-length studio albums. To promote their second studio album, Block Out the Sun & Sleep, To The Wind played over 2 weeks in Vans Warped Tour 2014.

Discography
 Foundations (EP) (2010)
 No More Than This (EP) (2012)
 Empty Eyes (2013)
 Block Out the Sun & Sleep (2014)
 The Brighter View (2016)

References

2008 establishments in Washington (state)
Melodic hardcore groups
Musical groups established in 2008
Musical groups from Seattle
Pure Noise Records artists
Hardcore punk groups from Washington (state)